California Motor Transport Co. v. Trucking Unlimited, 404 U.S. 508 (1972), was a landmark decision of the US Supreme Court involving the right to make petitions to the government. The right to petition is enshrined in the First Amendment to the United States Constitution as: "Congress shall make no law...abridging...the right of the people...to petition the Government for a redress of grievances." This case involved an accusation that one group of companies was using state and federal regulatory actions to eliminate competitors. The Supreme Court ruled that the right to petition is integral to the legal system but using lawful means to achieve unlawful restraint of trade is not protected.

Antitrust law
Antitrust law is the body of laws that exist in order to prevent companies from suppressing market competition from other companies. The Sherman Antitrust Act was a landmark piece of federal legislation passed in 1890 and "intended to prevent all contracts, combinations, and conspiracies which restrain or monopolize trade." The Clayton Antitrust Act followed in 1914 and allowed parties injured by anti-competitive actions to sue the violators for both injunctive relief (meaning the anti-competitive action had to stop) and treble damages (meaning the actual monetary damages suffered by the injured party would be multiplied by three times when determining the award granted). In two cases interpreting these laws (Eastern Railroad Conference v. Noerr Motor Freight Inc. and United Mine Workers v. Pennington), the Supreme Court had created the Noerr–Pennington doctrine. Because of the rights in the First Amendment, the Court had ruled in these cases that attempts to influence the passage or enforcement of laws were not antitrust law violations if such lobbying had the incidental effect of restricting competition.

Prior history
This case originated in a business dispute between two groups of trucking companies operating in California. Trucking companies in that state are regulated by the state's Public Utilities Commission (PUC) and the federal Interstate Commerce Commission (ICC). In order to legally operate as a trucking company, both regulatory authorities needed to grant operating rights to a business. Trucking Unlimited was the named plaintiff for a group of fourteen companies that accused the California Motor Transport Co. and eighteen others of forming a joint war chest. This fund was then used to oppose any applications by other companies to the PUC and ICC for operating rights and also court cases stemming from PUC or ICC decisions. In this way, the established companies were accused of using government regulators to enforce restraint of trade against potential new competitors. This scheme was alleged to have pursued regulatory and court delays in such applications regardless of the merit of opposing those applications just to increase costs and deter competitors.

The initial action in the federal District Court was dismissed for "failure to state a claim upon which relief can be granted". This is a pretrial motion available under the Federal Rules of Civil Procedure which means that, even if everything the plaintiffs said is true, the court agrees that there is no breach of any duty owed to the plaintiff or violation of the plaintiff's rights.

This ruling was appealed to the Ninth Circuit Court of Appeals. The appeals court considered that the Noerr and Pennington cases did not apply to "...a conspiracy to unreasonably restrain or monopolize trade through the use of judicial and administrative adjudicative proceedings." It ruled that the dismissal was improper and directed the case back to the district court for trial but California Motor Transport appealed to the Supreme Court.

Decision
The decision by William O. Douglas started by reviewing the Noerr-Pennington doctrine and reiterating the importance of the Right to Petition:  We conclude that it would be destructive of rights of association and of petition to hold that groups with common interests may not, without violating the antitrust laws, use the channels and procedures of state and federal agencies and courts to advocate their causes and points of view respecting resolution of their business and economic interests vis-a -vis their competitors. 

The Court went on to say that, like other First Amendment rights, the right to petition is not absolute. In Noerr, the Court had said in passing that this right would not protect companies when the lobbying actions were "a mere sham" to conceal activities intended to directly interfere with competitors. Douglas went on to distinguish between influencing public officials, which was allowed, and denying competitors access to government decision-makers and usurping regulatory processes for commercial ends. Both the plaintiffs and the defendants had a right to access the judiciary and regulatory tribunals. First amendment rights could not be used as a pretext to inflict direct harm. The allegations made by Trucking Unlimited should not have been dismissed because they accused California Motor Transport Co. of making exactly this type of subversion of the regulatory process. The Court affirmed the judgment of the Ninth Circuit and remanded it back to the District Court for trial.

Effects of decision
This case both extended and modified the Noerr-Pennington doctrine:
 The Court extended the protection of that doctrine to all departments of the government, including the Article I and Article III tribunals
 The Court established the First Amendment right to petition as the origin of the antitrust exception allowing companies to lobby for governmental action that might cause disadvantages to competitors
 The Court modified this exception to exclude cases where a competitor does not try to influence public officials but instead tries to deny others meaningful access to tribunals

Noerr-Pennington immunity from the Sherman Act would not apply to California Motor Transport Co. and its co-conspirators because their actions before the PUC, the ICC, and the courts were not an actual exercise of their right to petition, but a fraudulent attempt to prevent Trucking Unlimited and others from accessing those same governmental bodies.

See also
 List of United States Supreme Court cases, volume 404
 List of United States Supreme Court cases

References

External links
 

United States Supreme Court cases
United States Supreme Court cases of the Burger Court
1972 in United States case law